Traub is a German surname. Notable people with the surname include:

Andrew Traub (born 1988), Scottish football defender
Barbara Traub, American photographer
Charles H. Traub (born 1945), American photographer and educator
Daniel Traub (born 1971), American photographer and filmmaker
David S. Traub (born 1941), American architect, author and playwright
Erich Traub (1906–1985), German virologist
Franziska Traub (1962), German actress
Günter Traub (born 1939), German Olympic speed skater
Hamilton Paul Traub (1890–1983), American botanist
James Traub (born 1954), American journalist
Joseph F. Traub (1932–2015), computer scientist
Judy Traub (born 1940), American politician
Marvin Traub (1925–2012), American businessman
Paul Traub (born 1952), American lawyer
Percy Traub (1896–1948), Canadian hockey player
Peter E. Traub (1864–1956), American Army officer
Peter M. Traub (born 1974), American composer of electronic and acoustic music and sound installations
Rayme Traub (born 1983), American engineer and inventor of electrical devices
Sabrina Frederick-Traub (born 1996), Australian rules footballer
Sophie Traub (born 1989), Canadian actress
Stefan Traub (born 1969), Swiss curler
Yaron Traub (born 1964), Israeli conductor and pianist

See also
Traube

German-language surnames